The British West Indies Study Circle exists to promote interest in and the study of the stamps and postal history of the islands that comprise the British West Indies and in addition Bermuda, British Guiana (Guyana) and British Honduras (Belize) and the postal history and postal markings of other British interests in the Caribbean, and Central or South America.

The Circle publish a Quarterly Bulletin and other books and monographs relating to the area.

Selected publications
Montserrat by L.E. Britnor, revised by Charles Freeland.
The Encyclopaedia of Jamaican Philately. Various authors.
Trinidad - A Philatelic History to 1913 by Sir John Marriott, Michael Medlicott and Reuben A. Ramkissoon.

See also
British Caribbean Philatelic Study Group

References

External links
BWISC official website.
The postage stamps, envelopes, wrappers, post cards, and telegraph stamps of the British colonies in the West Indies together with British Honduras and the colonies in South America (1891) Full text ebook at archive.org.

Philately of Jamaica
Philatelic organizations
British West Indies
Philatelic organisations based in the United Kingdom
Philately of Trinidad and Tobago
Philately of British Guiana
Philately of Bermuda
Philately of the Bahamas
Philately of Montserrat
Philately of Barbados
Philately of St. Lucia
Philately of Antigua
Philately of the Turks and Caicos Islands
Philately of the British Virgin Islands
Philately of Belize
1954 establishments in the United Kingdom